The Power, The Passion is an Australian television daytime soap opera produced by the Seven Network in 1989.

The series was devised to lure audiences away from American imports such as The Bold and the Beautiful and The Young and the Restless but failed to make an impact and was cancelled due to low ratings after 168 episodes.

Cast
The cast included: 
 Kevin Miles – Gordon Byrne
 Olivia Hamnett – Ellen Edmonds
 Tracy Tainsh – Kathryn Byrne
 Susie Cato – Anna Wright
 Ian Rawlings – Ryan McAllister
 Danny Roberts – Samuel Wright
 Jill Forster – Sarah McAllister
 George Mallaby – Justin Wright
 Lucinda Cowden – Danielle Edmonds
 Nick Carrafa – Nick Cassala
 Alan Cassell – Dr. Andrew Edmonds
 Ross Thompson – Thomas
 Jane Clifton – Carla Graham
 Jon Finlayson – William Somerset
 Julian McMahon – Kane Edmonds
 Neil Grant – Adam Edmonds
 Susan Ellis – Talia Edmonds
 Libby Purvis – Rebecca Wright
 Jacqui Gordon – Susan Walsh

Julian McMahon made his TV debut in the series. At one point the program included a gay male character, Steven (Joseph Spano). The character was killed off after a few months.

References

External links
Aussie Soap Archive: The Power, The Passion

Australian television soap operas
Seven Network original programming
1989 Australian television series debuts
1990 Australian television series endings
English-language television shows